The Teacher Training College of Bielsko-Biala (Kolegium Nauczycielskie w Bielsku-Białej) was an educational institution in Poland. It was established in 1991 continuing more than century-old traditions of teacher training in the city and region. It was the largest teacher training college in the country. 
The college was closed down on September 30, 2015.

The college had five specialities:
 Polish language, science information and librarianship
 early education
 mathematics with informatics
 special education - rehabilitation pedagogy with elements of prevention
 special education - oligophrenopedagogy

All the education was done under the academic supervision of well-known universities:
 Jagiellonian University in Kraków
 Pedagogical Academy in Kraków
 University of Silesia in Katowice
 Jan Dlugosz Academy in Czestochowa

Graduates were granted a college graduation diploma and BA (licencjat) degree awarded by either of the supervising universities. This allowed them to continue their MA studies there.

External links
Official website

Universities and colleges in Poland